8th Street station is a subway station complex in Philadelphia, Pennsylvania, located at the intersection of 8th Street and Market Street in Center City. It is served by SEPTA's Market–Frankford and Broad–Ridge Spur lines, as well as the PATCO Speedline (signed by SEPTA as the "Lindenwold Line"). The entire complex is owned by SEPTA, while the PATCO areas are leased by the Delaware River Port Authority, which operates that line. 8th Street is the only station in Philadelphia where these three subway lines interchange.

The complex consists of three stations, 8th Street on the Market–Frankford Line, 8th & Market on the Broad–Ridge Spur (also sporadically signed as "8th Street"), and 8th & Market on the PATCO Speedline. The complex consists of three underground levels, a mezzanine crossing the Market–Frankford tracks on the upper level, Market–Frankford trains running east–west and Broad–Ridge trains running north on the middle level, and PATCO running north–south on the lower level. Each platform has its own entrances/exits and fare control, but are connected via a mezzanine.

For decades the corner of 8th and Market was a retail hub for the city, with major department stores Strawbridge's, Gimbels and Lit Brothers all located at the intersection and all containing direct access to the subway station. This underground connection now serves the Fashion District Philadelphia shopping mall, which provides indirect access to SEPTA Regional Rail lines at Jefferson Station, as well as the Broad Street Line via the Downtown Link concourse.

History 

The east-west upper level platforms (now Market–Frankford Line) opened on August 3, 1908, as part of the first extension of the Philadelphia Rapid Transit Company's 1907-opened Market Street Subway. On December 21, 1932, the Broad-Ridge Spur of the Broad Street Line opened, with its terminus at a new lower-level island platform (signed as Market Street). Bridge Line service to Camden began on June 7, 1936, using a 1932-built tunnel connecting the lower level tracks to the Delaware River Bridge.

Beginning in 1949, Ridge Spur and Bridge Line trains were through-routed, reversing at Market Street station. On February 15, 1953, the Locust Street Subway opened, extending the lower level tracks south and west to 16th and Locust streets. Bridge Line trains were extended to 16th and Locust, while Ridge Spur trains terminated at Market. In January 1954, due to low ridership on the extension, off-peak service and Saturday again began operating between Girard and Camden, with a shuttle train operating between 8th and 16th stations. Sunday service was suspended at that time due to minimal usage.

Over the weekend of August 23–27, 1968, tracks at the station were reconfigured as part of the construction of the Lindenwold High-Speed Line (PATCO Speedline). Ridge Spur trains were redirected to a new single-track upper level terminus platform, separating the spur from the 8th–Locust Street subway. Bridge Line service was temporarily divided into 16th and Locust–8th Street and 8th Street–Camden segments, with a cross-platform transfer at 8th Street. Bridge Line service was suspended from December 29, 1968, to February 15, 1969, when the new service began.

The station complex was made accessible in 2009. One of the escalators was replaced from spring 2015 to spring 2016 as part of SEPTA's Center City Concourse Improvement Program.

Station layout 

The Market–Frankford Line's 8th Street station is located on the upper platform level. There are two side platforms on the north and south sides of the tracks. Passengers may transfer between platforms via an upper mezzanine both inside and outside the paid area of the station. This mezzanine area also connects to the lower level of the Fashion District Philadelphia shopping mall. As a Market–Frankford Line station, columns and accent work throughout the two platforms are painted blue.

The Broad–Ridge Spur's 8th & Market station is the southern terminus of the line. There is a single track and platform located perpendicular and adjacent to the Market–Frankford westbound platform. There is no free connection to the Market–Frankford Line, as the MFL has a free connection to the main Broad Street Line at City Hall station. Trains on this platform level formerly used a now-abandoned track to connect to the Locust Street subway (now part of the PATCO Speedline). The station was originally named Market Street, as evidenced by the tile work on the station, and the line was originally named the "Ridge–8th subway" due to its southern terminus at this station. As a Broad Street Line station, columns and accent work on the platform are painted orange.

The lower level of the complex houses PATCO's 8th & Market station. PATCO Speedline trains stop at an island platform perpendicular to the Market–Frankford platforms. There are two fare control barriers located directly underneath each Market–Frankford Line platform. Each fare control area contains a staircase, an elevator, and  "up" escalator. Each PATCO platform has a distinct accent color: the 8th & Market accent color is teal.

The Broad–Ridge Spur and Market–Frankford Line platforms, while on the same level, are perpendicular to each other.

Notable places nearby 
The station is within walking distance of the following notable places:
 Independence National Historical Park
 Pennsylvania Convention Center

References

External links 

 8th & Market (PATCO)

SEPTA Market-Frankford Line stations
SEPTA Broad Street Line stations
PATCO Speedline stations in Philadelphia
Railway stations in the United States opened in 1908
Railway stations in Philadelphia
Railway stations located underground in Pennsylvania
1908 establishments in Pennsylvania